Lluis Codina Codina (born 17 February 1973) is a Spanish former footballer who played as an attacking midfielder.

Club career
Born in Taradell, Barcelona, Catalonia, Codina amassed Segunda División totals of 267 games and 21 goals over the course of ten seasons, representing in the competition Deportivo Alavés, CD Leganés, Gimnàstic de Tarragona and SD Eibar. He made his senior debut with CE L'Hospitalet in 1992, in his native region.

Having retired in June 2010 at the age of 37, Codina subsequently had a three-year coaching spell at CD Mirandés, assisting Carlos Pouso in two Segunda División B seasons and one in the second tier.

References

External links

1973 births
Living people
People from Osona
Sportspeople from the Province of Barcelona
Spanish footballers
Footballers from Catalonia
Association football midfielders
Segunda División players
Segunda División B players
CE L'Hospitalet players
Deportivo Alavés players
CD Leganés players
Gimnàstic de Tarragona footballers
SD Eibar footballers